Star Maa Movies (formerly Maa Movies) is an Indian Telugu-language pay television channel owned by The Walt Disney Company India. a wholly owned by The Walt Disney Company. it's primarily telecast Telugu  movies. as of June 2017, the channel has a library of over 800 movie titles. It also airs sports events including the Indian Premier League (IPL) and Indian Super League (ISL).

The channel was launched as Maa Movies by Maa Television Network on 4 February 2011. in February 2015, Star India acquired broadcast business of Maa Television Network for an estimated price of 2,0002,500 crore. In June 2017, the channel was rebranded as Star Maa Movies. the HD version of the channel, Star Maa Movies HD, was also launched at the same time.

History 
Penmetsa Murali Krishnam Raju founded MAA Television Network in 2001 as a corporate entity. Its flagship TV channel, MAA TV was launched in April 2002.

On 4 February 2011, Maa TV Network launched two new channels, Maa Movies and Maa Junior with content focused on movies and children respectively. Coinciding with the occasion, film actor Ram Charan was inducted as a Director on the board of the company.

In February 2015, Star India acquired broadcast business of Maa Television Network for an estimated price of 2,0002,500 crore. In June 2017, Maa Movies was rebranded as Star Maa Movies. The HD version of the channel, Star Maa Movies HD, was also launched at the same time. As of June 2017, the channel has a library of over 800 movie titles.

References

Telugu-language television channels
Movie channels in India
Television channels and stations established in 2005
Television stations in Hyderabad
Disney Star